The CaMLA English Placement Test (EPT) is used principally by English language teaching schools to assess students’ language ability levels and place them in the right English language course. Organizations also use it as a screening tool to assess applicants' command of the English language.

The CaMLA EPT is developed by CaMLA, a not-for-profit collaboration between the University of Michigan and the University of Cambridge, and has been in use for over four decades.  A major revision of the test occurred in 2013 leading to the launch of CaMLA EPT Forms D, E and F.  A further three test forms were released in 2015: Forms G, H and I.

The CaMLA EPT can be used with learners of English as a second language at all levels, from beginners to advanced. It tests the following key skills: listening comprehension, reading comprehension, grammatical knowledge and vocabulary range. The test can be taken on either a computer or on paper.

Test format

There are multiple forms of the test (Forms D, E, F, G, H and I), which are parallel in difficulty. Each form has unique content—no questions are shared across the different forms.

All the CaMLA EPT forms use the same test format:
 The test lasts 60 minutes.
 There are 80 questions.
 All questions are multiple-choice, with three options for questions in the listening section, and four options for the questions in the other sections.

The CaMLA EPT has the following test sections:

The computer-based test contains exactly the same items, in exactly the same order, as the paper-based test.  Research has shown that the two different delivery methods lead to test takers achieving statistically equivalent results.

Scoring

In the computer-based test, results are available instantly as soon as the test is completed.

In the paper-based test, the institution scores the test using the provided scoring template. Institutions can administer the test, calculate scores and report back to test takers within one day.

Test-takers receive a total score between 0–80. Scores have been allocated into six levels of language ability, although it is up to each institution to determine their exact cut-off points.

Test scores are also linked to the proficiency levels of the Common European Framework of Reference for Language (CEFR).

Older versions of the CaMLA EPT Test (e.g. Forms A, B and C) use the same scoring approach. Institutions can use equivalence tables to see how raw scores on the current forms of the test compare to the raw scores on the older version of the test, which had 100 items.

Usage

Typically, the CaMLA EPT is used by language schools to test incoming language learners whose English language level is not known.  Test scores are used to place learners in level-appropriate classes.

Institutions may administer the CaMLA EPT again after a period of instruction to assess learners’ readiness to advance to the next level course.  Alternatively, institutions may choose to use tests specifically focused at a learner’s level, such as the MTELP Series to measure the learner’s progress.

Many English language institutions use CaMLA EPT to make placement decisions and as proof of English language proficiency. Examples include:
 American English College 
 American National University 
 American English & Culture Programs 
 Atlantic Union College
 Carson-Newman University 
 ESL English School Chicago Ivy 
 New America College
 Sacred Heart University
 Solex College 
 University of Charleston 
 Webster University.

Preparation

CaMLA provides free sample test questions on the official website.

See also
 CaMLA 
 Examination for the Certificate of Competency in English (ECCE) 
 Examination for the Certificate of Proficiency in English (ECPE) 
 MTELP Series 
 Michigan English Language Assessment Battery (MELAB) 
 Michigan English Test (MET) 
 Young Learners Tests of English (YLTE) 
 Cambridge Assessment English 
 English as a Foreign or Second Language

References

External links
 Official website

CaMLA assessments
English language tests
English-language education
English as a second or foreign language
Standardized tests for English language